Pleuroprucha insulsaria, the common tan wave moth, is a moth of the family Geometridae. The species was first described by Achille Guenée in 1857. It is found in eastern North America, from Nova Scotia to Florida, west to Texas and Colorado and north to Ontario. It ranges south through Mexico and Central America into South America (including Venezuela) and has been recorded as far south as the Galápagos Islands. It has also been recorded from the West Indies, including Jamaica.

The wingspan is 14-21  mm. The wings are mottled yellowish brown with lines running parallel to the outer margin. The subterminal line is pale, slightly wavy and punctuated by small black dots. Adults are on wing from March or April to October in the southern part of the range. In the north, adults have been recorded from June to October.

The larvae feed on a wide range of plants, including Solanum dulcamara, Galium, Zea mays, Solidago, Castanea, Quercus and Salix species.

References

External links

Moths described in 1857
Cosymbiini